Zieria graniticola is a plant in the citrus family Rutaceae and is a dense, compact shrub with erect wiry branches, three-part leaves and pale pink flowers in groups of up to three, each with four petals and four stamens. It is only known from two population near Stanthorpe in Queensland, Australia.

Description
Both sides of the leaflets are more or less glabrous, sometimes with a few hairs on the mid-vein.

Taxonomy and naming
Zieria graniticola was first formally described in 2007 by Marco Duretto and Paul Forster from an unpublished manuscript of James Armstrong. The type specimen was collected in the Passchendale State Forest near Stanthorpe and the description was published in Austrobaileya. The specific epithet (graniticola) is a reference to the habitat of this species. The suffix -cola is a Latin word meaning "dweller".

Distribution and habitat
This zieria grows in open forest with a shrubby understorey. It occurs in two disjunct populations north and south of Stanthorpe, growing in sandy soil over granite.

Conservation
Zieria graniticola is listed as "endangered" under the Queensland Nature Conservation Act 1992.

References

External links
 

graniticola
Sapindales of Australia
Flora of Queensland
Plants described in 2007